Agnieszka Chylińska is a Polish singer.

From 1994 to 2003, she was the vocalist for the Polish rock band O.N.A. Since 2003 she has performed as Chylińska and in 2004 she released an album titled Winna. Since 2008 she has been a judge on the Polish version of the Got Talent franchise called Mam talent!. In 2009, she released a studio album Modern Rocking, then Forever Child (2016), Pink Punk (2018) and Never Ending Sorry (2022).

Discography

Studio albums

Live albums

Singles

Music videos

References

External links
 

Year of birth missing (living people)
Place of birth missing (living people)
Living people
Musicians from Gdańsk
Polish pop singers
Polish rock singers
Polish lyricists
21st-century Polish singers
21st-century Polish women singers